In enzymology, a deoxyguanosine kinase is an enzyme that catalyzes the chemical reaction

ATP + deoxyguanosine  ADP + dGMP

Thus, the two substrates of this enzyme are ATP and deoxyguanosine, whereas its two products are ADP and dGMP.

This enzyme belongs to the family of transferases, specifically those transferring phosphorus-containing groups (phosphotransferases) with an alcohol group as acceptor.  The systematic name of this enzyme class is ATP:deoxyguanosine 5'-phosphotransferase. Other names in common use include deoxyguanosine kinase (phosphorylating), (dihydroxypropoxymethyl)guanine kinase, 2'-deoxyguanosine kinase, and NTP-deoxyguanosine 5'-phosphotransferase.  This enzyme participates in purine metabolism.

Structural studies

Clinical

Mutations in this gene have been linked to inherited mitochondrial DNA depletion syndromes, neonatal liver failure, nystagmus and hypotonia.

References

 
 

EC 2.7.1
Enzymes of known structure